Pillon is a commune in the Meuse department in Grand Est in north-eastern France.

Geography
The river Othain forms most of the commune's eastern border.

See also
Communes of the Meuse department

References

Communes of Meuse (department)
Meuse communes articles needing translation from French Wikipedia